Mihály Richárd Bodor (born 4 March 1962) is a Hungarian swimmer. He competed in two events at the 1988 Summer Olympics.

References

External links
 

1962 births
Living people
Hungarian male swimmers
Olympic swimmers of Hungary
Swimmers at the 1988 Summer Olympics
Swimmers from Chicago